Alexander Robertson (born 26 April 1971) is a Scottish former footballer who played in midfield.

Early life
His father, Malcolm Robertson, was also a professional footballer, with Ayr United, Heart of Midlothian and Hibernian.

Club career
Robertson began his career with Rangers where manager Graeme Souness labelled him the best young player in Britain. He scored Rangers' first goal under manager Walter Smith in a 1–0 victory over St Mirren on 20 April 1991 at Love Street.

Robertson then joined Coventry City in England. In July 1995 he returned to Scotland, Dundee United buying him and Steven Pressley for a joint fee of £1 million.

International career
Robertson made two appearances for the Scotland under-21 team at the 1991 Toulon Tournament.

Personal life
In August 1997 he was jailed for assaulting a restaurant doorman in Edinburgh while drunk. He had a previous conviction for assault in 1991. Robertson later received facial scarring in a bottle attack.

See also
 1995–96 Dundee United F.C. season
 1996–97 Dundee United F.C. season

External links

References

1971 births
Living people
Footballers from Edinburgh
Scottish footballers
Rangers F.C. players
Coventry City F.C. players
Dundee United F.C. players
Airdrieonians F.C. (1878) players
Inverness Caledonian Thistle F.C. players
Livingston F.C. players
Clydebank F.C. (1965) players
Cowdenbeath F.C. players
Berwick Rangers F.C. players
Raith Rovers F.C. players
Scottish Football League players
Premier League players
National Soccer League (Australia) players
Scotland under-21 international footballers
Association football midfielders
Gippsland Falcons players
Scottish expatriate sportspeople in Australia
Scottish expatriate footballers
Scottish people convicted of assault
Scottish prisoners and detainees
20th-century Scottish criminals